Willsborough is a small townland in the Barony of Ormond Lower, County Tipperary, Ireland. Although the Placenames Database of Ireland gives Willsborough as the Irish language name, 19th century records indicate that the area was formerly known as Derrynashig.

References

Townlands of County Tipperary
Untranslated Irish place names